The following table lists the cricket grounds in Madhya Pradesh that have hosted First-Class Matches and List A Cricket Matches as well as Twenty20 cricket. Also, included in the list are the cricket grounds that have hosted International matches in Madhya Pradesh.

International Venues

Domestic Venues

Proposed Venues

References

External links 

 Cricketrchive
 Cricinfo

 
Cricket grounds
M